Alfred Hubbard may refer to:

Alfred Hubbard (mayor) (c. 1812–1887), alderman and mayor of Brisbane Municipal Council
Alfred Matthew Hubbard (1901–1982), early proponent for the drug LSD during the 1950s
Alfred J. Hubbard (1902–1976), managing director of the printers Perkins Bacon & Co.

See also
Al Hubbard (disambiguation)
Allan Hubbard (disambiguation)